Red Hill is a summit on the eastern slope of the Diablo Range, in Merced County, California. The Red Mountain Road (formerly the Cottonwood Grade), runs over this ridge between Fifield Road on the divide of the Diablo Range and McCabe Road on Romero Creek.

References 

Mountains of Merced County, California